was a Japanese businessman, central banker, the 27th Governor of the Bank of Japan (BOJ) and a Director of the Bank for International Settlements (BIS).

Early life
Matsushita was born in Hyōgo prefecture.  He is a graduate of Hyogo Prefectural 1st Kobe Boys’ School (now, Hyogo Prefectural Kobe High School) and the University of Tokyo Law School.

Career
After the graduation from the University of Tokyo, he entered the Ministry of Finance in 1950. He smoothly moved up through the ranks to the level of Director-General of the Budget Bureau and Vice‐Minister of Finance. Matsushita became Governor of the Bank of Japan from December 17, 1994 to March 20, 1998. He died at 92.

Notes

References
 Werner, Richard A. (2003). Princes of the Yen: Japan's Central Bankers and the Transformation of the Economy. Armonk, New York: M.E. Sharpe. ;  OCLC 471605161

1926 births
2018 deaths
University of Tokyo alumni
Recipients of the Order of the Sacred Treasure, 1st class
Governors of the Bank of Japan
People from Hyōgo Prefecture